Josh Abbott Band is a Texas country band originally from Lubbock, composed of Josh Abbott (vocals, guitar), Austin Davis (banjo), Preston Wait (fiddle, guitar, steel), Edward Villanueva (drums), Caleb Keeter (guitar), David Fralin (keys/mandolin), and Jimmy Hartman (bass guitar, harmony vocals).

Biography
Josh Abbott founded the band in 2006 in Lubbock, Texas while attending Texas Tech University, where he was a member of the Texas Epsilon chapter of Phi Delta Theta. He founded the band while in grad school with fraternity brothers Austin Davis, Neel Huey, and Andrew Hurt. The band recorded a 4-song demo including "Taste" in 2007 along with fiddler Preston Wait and began touring in 2008. Huey and Hurt dropped out to pursue careers while Preston Wait and Eddie Villanueva officially joined. The band then recorded their debut album “Scapegoat” in 2008 as well. Caleb Keeter and James Hertless joined in 2010, with Hertless eventually departing in 2018.

The sophomore album, She's Like Texas, followed in 2010 and entered the Top Country Albums chart. Michael Berick of Allmusic rated it four stars out of five, comparing it to Steve Earle and saying that Abbott's songwriting showed "maturity". They had their first sell-out crowd at "Billy Bobs Texas" in the historic Fort Worth Stockyards on February 10, 2010, selling 6,000 tickets.

"She's Like Texas" includes the single "Oh, Tonight", which entered the Country Songs chart in early 2011 at #59 and peaked at #44. The song is a duet with Kacey Musgraves, the Nashville Star season 5 finalist and Universal Music recording artist.

The band's third CD, Small Town Family Dream, was released on April 24, 2012. It was their highest-charting album, debuting at #5 on Top Country Albums, selling 21,000 copies in the US in its first week. The second single, "Touch", was released in early February and was made available digitally on February 14. Its music video includes the reality TV star Melissa Rycroft and her husband Tye Strickland, another of Abbott's fraternity brothers. The single was featured in the motion picture The Longest Ride, based on the novel by Nicholas Sparks.

In August 2015, the band announced their fourth studio album, titled Front Row Seat, a concept album detailing Abbott's relationship and failed marriage. The first single off of the album, "Amnesia", was released in August 2015 with SiriusXM The Highway premiering the lyric video for the single. "Front Row Seat" was released everywhere on November 6, 2015, and debuted on the Top Country Albums chart at #9, selling 12,800 copies in its first week.

Josh Abbott Band's single "Wasn't That Drunk", featuring Carly Pearce, was released to radio on March 21, 2016. The second single from Front Row Seat, "Wasn't That Drunk", garnered attention from a national radio and media audience. The band made their national television debut with the single on Jimmy Kimmel Live! on May 31, 2016, and performed "Amnesia" on CONAN on January 18, 2017.

On August 18, 2017, Josh Abbott Band released their 5th studio album titled "Until My Voice Goes Out" which included a string and horn section. The string and horn section were also incorporated on the national "Until My Voice Goes Out" tour. "Until My Voice Goes Out is an eclectic album built from Abbott’s life experiences ranging from the birth of his daughter to the sudden and heartbreaking death of his father one month into the album-making process, all weaved together with striking strings and horns."

The band performed at the 2017 Route 91 Harvest, the scene of the 2017 Las Vegas shooting.

Discography

Albums

Extended plays

Singles

Music videos

References

2006 establishments in Texas
Country music groups from Texas
Musical groups established in 2006
Musical groups from Lubbock, Texas
Texas Tech University alumni